Gaston Grimbert (15 August 1914 – 11 April 2011) was a French racing cyclist. He rode in the 1938 Tour de France.

References

1914 births
2011 deaths
French male cyclists
Place of birth missing